Konstantin Yevgenyevich Skrylnikov (born 16 July 1979) is a former Russian professional footballer.

Club career
He made his debut in the Russian Premier League in 2003 for FC Rotor Volgograd. He played 2 games in the UEFA Cup 2006–07 with FC Rubin Kazan. Near the end of his career, Skrylnikov joined his hometown side FC Fakel Voronezh.

References

External links
 

1979 births
Footballers from Voronezh
Living people
Russian footballers
Association football midfielders
FC Lada-Tolyatti players
FC Rotor Volgograd players
FC Tom Tomsk players
FC Rubin Kazan players
FC Anzhi Makhachkala players
FC Ural Yekaterinburg players
Russian Premier League players
FC Shinnik Yaroslavl players
FC Fakel Voronezh players